Brian Rattray (born 1950) is a Scottish former international lawn and indoor bowls player.

Rattray won a silver medal in the triples and a bronze medal in the fours at the 1984 World Outdoor Bowls Championship in Aberdeen.

He represented Scotland in the fours at the 1982 Commonwealth Games.

He was the singles champion at the 1982 Scottish National Bowls Championships which meant that he represented Scotland the following year at the British Isles Bowls Championships.

References

1950 births
Scottish male bowls players
Living people